The Edward L. Ryerson Conservation Area is a protected area and historic district in Riverwoods, Illinois, United States. The area was a weekend getaway for businessman Edward L. Ryerson, who built a cabin there in 1928. He built three other cabins for friends, and had a country house built in 1942. It is representative of the type of getaways used by successful Chicagoans who sought the tranquil surroundings of the Des Plaines River. The Ryersons donated the property to the Lake County Forest Preserve district for public use.  are recognized as the Edward L. Ryerson Area Historic District.

History 
Native American tribes with a history of settlement and activity along the Des Plaines River include the United Nation of Chippewa, Ottawa, and Potawatomi. The 1833 Treaty of Chicago resulted in significant growth in European settlement of this area.

The Des Plaines River was first used by settlers as a recreational retreat in the early 1920s. Three cabins were built along the river between 1923 and 1928 for Frederick A. Preston, Everett L. Millard, and Cecil Barnes. All were wealthy businessman who lived in the North Shore. Barnes was a friend of the Ryerson family and introduced the cabin idea to them. Ryerson purchased  just west of the Barnes property and built his own cabin in 1928. Ryerson had just become the president of the Ryerson Steel Company upon the death of his father. He was also the president of the Chicago Council of Social Agencies.

In 1938, the owners of a large, adjacent tract of land announced that they intended to sell their property. Ryerson was concerned that the  lot would be developed, thus threatening the peaceful surroundings of the cabin. Ryerson, now President of the Inland Steel Company, elected to purchase the property himself and develop a farm. Ryerson commissioned Edwin Hill Clark, a North Shore architect, to design the property. Clark is confirmed to have designed a dairy barn and a farm equipment building; it is assumed due to design similarities that Clark also designed the farmhouse and two sheds. Ryerson purchased a herd of Guernsey cattle, but soon found milking to be too tedious. He sold the herd and instead purchased beef cattle, hogs, and Arabian horses.

As the Ryersons awaited the development of their farm, the 1938 New England hurricane destroyed "Aucoot Haven", the family vacation home in Marion, Massachusetts. Ryerson decided to build a new country house on his large property. Ryerson commissioned Ambrose Cramer to design a Greek Revival inspired by the Anson and Orson Rogers Houses in Marengo. Cramer was chosen because he lived in Galena, a city with many Greek Revival residences. Furthermore, Cramer's half-sister was married to Ryerson's brother.

Other cabins
Hermon Dunlap "Dutch" Smith, the vice president of Marsh & McLennan, purchased  to the east of Barnes' property. He built a cabin near the river in 1935. Smith enjoyed the surroundings so much that he wrote The Des Plaines River 1673-1940: A Brief Consideration of its Names and History, published in 1940. Architect Ambrose Cramer built a cabin in 1940 while designing Ryerson's house. However, he never used it, instead retiring to Maine in 1942. His cabin was moved north of Aptakisic Road in the 1970s. Artist Ivan Albright built a cabin in the 1950s.

Forest preserve

The Ryerson family built a winter home in Palm Desert, California. By the 1950s, the Ryersons began to vacation there instead of in the cabin retreat. The total Ryerson donations eventually totaled . Ryerson successfully convinced the other landholders to donate their properties. Albright sold his property in 1968. David Dangler, who had come into possession of the Millard property in the 1950s, likewise sold  to the district the next year. Borland donated his acreage in 1985; the forest preserve moved his cabin north of Aptakisic Road for use as an interpretive center. The Millard, Barnes, and Preston cabins have been demolished. By 1972, the Forest Preserve occupied .

The preserve includes  of trails for hikers and cross-country skiers. The  Ned Ryerson Trail, so-named for Ryerson's son, is wheelchair accessible and features an audio guide for the visually impaired. More than half of the land is recognized as an Illinois Nature Preserve.

Historic district

On February 29, 1996,  of the forest preserve was recognized by the National Park Service as the Edward L. Ryerson Area Historic District, a listing on the National Register of Historic Places. These lands only include the land owned by Ryerson by 1945 and exclude land purchased from the Hess family. There are ten buildings, one site, one structure, and three objects on the property contributing to its historic fabric. These buildings include most of the farmstead, the country house, and four of the five remaining cabins (Albright's excluded).

References

National Register of Historic Places in Lake County, Illinois
Neoclassical architecture in Illinois
Greek Revival architecture in Illinois
Houses completed in 1942
Buildings and structures in Lake County, Illinois
Protected areas of Lake County, Illinois
Parks in Illinois
1966 establishments in Illinois